Hampton Hawes at the Piano is an album by American jazz pianist Hampton Hawes, recorded in 1976 and released on the Contemporary label in 1978. The album was Hawes's final recording before his death in 1977 and was the first to be released posthumously.

Reception
The Allmusic review by Scott Yanow states: "he was still in prime form".

Track listing
 "Killing Me Softly with His Song" (Charles Fox, Norman Gimbel) – 6:04
 "Soul Sign Eight" (Hampton Hawes) – 8:11
 "Sunny" (Bobby Hebb) – 5:00
 "Morning" (Hawes) – 7:28
 "Blue in Green" (Miles Davis, Bill Evans) – 5:25
 "When I Grow Too Old to Dream" (Sigmund Romberg, Oscar Hammerstein II) – 6:42

Personnel
Hampton Hawes – piano
Ray Brown – bass
Shelly Manne – drums

References

Contemporary Records albums
Hampton Hawes albums
1978 albums